South Bersted is a village and parish in the Arun district of West Sussex, England. It forms part of the built up area of Bognor Regis and lies on the A259 and A29 roads one mile (1.6 km) north of the town centre.

The Anglican parish church of Saint Mary Magdalene is mainly 13th century including the tower. Beginning as a chapel of Pagham it was a separate parish including Bognor by 1465.

South Bersted C of E primary school has gained bronze and silver awards as an Eco-school.

References

Villages in West Sussex
Arun District
Populated coastal places in West Sussex